The Hitachi A-train is a family of rail rolling stock built and designed by Hitachi Rail using a common base and construction techniques. The stock is designed to facilitate a number of product life-cycle improvements including ease of manufacture, increased energy efficiency, and recyclability.

Description 
The "A-train" design concept includes several elements. The primary feature is that vehicle car bodies are constructed from double skin aluminium extruded sections, which are friction stir welded, creating a strong body. Other features include hollow, extruded mounting rails on the vehicle body to which modular components are attached.

Initially the A-train family consisted of multiple units designed and built by Hitachi, for use on the railway system in Japan. It comprises trains for both commuter and limited express services. The modular design enables both production and refurbishment to be undertaken faster. Due to the low heat input of friction stir welding, high strength, excellent crashworthiness and minimal distortion can be achieved.

Japanese trains 
Hitachi has provided a number of trains based on the A-train concept for use in Japan:
 E257 series - a limited express EMU operated by the East Japan Railway Company (JR East)
 815 series -  a commuter EMU operated by the Kyushu Railway Company (JR Kyushu) and the first A-train type to enter service
 817 series - a commuter EMU operated by the Kyushu Railway Company (JR Kyushu)
 683 series - a limited express EMU operated on the Hokuriku Main Line by the West Japan Railway Company (JR West)
289 series - limited express EMU converted from surplus 683 series sets
 883-1000 series - additional cars built to augment existing 883 series Sonic EMUs operated by the Kyushu Railway Company (JR Kyushu)
 885 series - a limited express EMU operated by the Kyushu Railway Company (JR Kyushu)
 Fukuoka Subway 3000 series - an EMU type operated on Fukuoka City Subway's Nanakuma Line
 Hankyu 9000 series - a commuter EMU operated by Hankyu Railway
 Hankyu 9300 series - a commuter EMU operated by Hankyu Railway
 Seibu 20000 series - a commuter EMU operated by the Seibu Railway
 Seibu 30000 series - a commuter EMU operated by the Seibu Railway
 Tobu 50000 series - a commuter EMU operated by the Tobu Railway
 Tokyo Metro 05 series - an EMU type operated on the Tokyo Metro Tōzai Line
 Tokyo Metro 10000 series - an EMU type operated on the Tokyo Metro Fukutoshin Line and Tokyo Metro Yūrakuchō Line
 Tokyo Metro 15000 series - an EMU type operated on the Tokyo Metro Tōzai Line
 Tokyo Metro 16000 series - an EMU type operated on the Tokyo Metro Chiyoda Line built in cooperation with Kawasaki
 Tokyo Metro 17000 series - an EMU type operated on the Tokyo Metro Yūrakuchō Line and Tokyo Metro Fukutoshin Line
 Tokyo Metro 18000 series - an EMU type operated on the Tokyo Metro Hanzōmon Line
 Tōyō Rapid 2000 series - a commuter EMU operated by the Tōyō Rapid Railway Line
 TX-1000 series - a commuter EMU operated by the Metropolitan Intercity Railway Company on Tsukuba Express services, built by Kawasaki to A-train specifications
 TX-2000 series - a commuter EMU operated by the Metropolitan Intercity Railway Company on Tsukuba Express services
 Sotetsu 20000 and 21000 series - a commuter EMU operated by the Sagami Railway

A-train family overseas 

For their products overseas, the Hitachi A-train has different designations by Hitachi depending on their type.

 AT100 = high-density urban trains
 AT200 = suburban, commuter and regional trains.
 AT300 = intercity high speed and long-distance trains
 AT400 = high-speed 'bullet' trains

Hitachi have been marketing the A-train family overseas. Both the Chongqing Monorail in China and the Sentosa Express Monorail in Singapore utilise A-train derived cars. 

In 2005 Hitachi received an order from Taiwan Railway Administration (TRA) for six 8-car trains, based on the Japanese 885 series, designated as TEMU1000, for operation on the main line between Taipei and Hualien. Deliveries of the trains began in late 2006, with the first public test of the new trains in March 2007. Two more sets were purchased in December 2014, and delivered in early 2016.

In 2007, Korail ordered eight 4-car express trains branded as the Trunk-Line Electric Car (TEC) to Hitachi. The car bodies, bogies and power systems were made in Japan, but were assembled at SLS Heavy Industry in Changwon, Korea. A significant number of the components were replaced by Korean parts.

In 2018, the Taiwan Railway Administration placed a new order for 50 12-car EMU3000 series sets, to be delivered between 2021 and 2024. The first set was delivered on July 31, 2021, with service entry scheduled for the end of the year.

Between 2019 and 2021, the first Hitachi AT100 units arrived in Bangkok for the SRT Dark Red Line and SRT Light Red Line, which opened on 2 August 2021. These trains are coloured red, and are very reminiscent of a typical Japanese commuter train. 15 units form 6-car sets, while 10 form 4-car sets.

United Kingdom 
The United Kingdom became the first country outside Japan to place a major conventional rail order for Hitachi when Southeastern ordered 29 electric multiple units for use on domestic services on the High Speed 1 line. Southeastern branded these trains as the Javelin, a reference to the 2012 Summer Olympics.

Hitachi gained further ground in the UK market when it was announced in 2009 that an A-train based design similar to that of the Class 395, initially named the Hitachi Super Express, was the preference for the government's Intercity Express Programme tender to replace InterCity 125 and InterCity 225 sets on the Greater Western and InterCity East Coast lines. These units were classified as Class 800 electro-diesel 'bi-mode' units (powered by AC overhead wires where available, and by underfloor diesel generators beyond the extents of electrification) and Class 801 electric multiple units sets powered purely by AC overhead wires. The train specification allows for the conversion of Class 800s to Class 801s, as it is assumed that electrification will continue to expand. The units would form as part of the Hitachi AT300 product, joining the Class 395 in the same family.

The choice of Hitachi units was controversial, as it would see little final manufacturing in the UK in comparison to the foreign-owned but domestically manufactured Bombardier option, leading to a campaign to reverse the decision. However, it was economics that became a sticking point, with the weight of the design creeping up (though some accused the Department for Transport of producing impossible specification requirements) and reportedly difficult negotiations over the final unit price and production balance between the different power options. The inability or reluctance of the financial markets to provide the necessary capital was the final straw, leading to the announcement in February 2010 of a three-month independent review into the value for money of the programme.

After winning the franchise, Abellio ScotRail announced they would purchase Hitachi AT200 trains (designated as Class 385) for their commuter services. 

In March 2015, after the initial order of the Class 800 units, Great Western Railway (or First Great Western as it was at the time) ordered 29 bi-mode Class 802 units which would also join the AT300 product. These units have little difference over the Class 800 units, except that the 802s have a larger power output to cope with gradients in Devon and Cornwall, and are built with larger fuel tanks. Being a bi-mode unit, they will also use overhead electric power between London Paddington and Newbury stations. Having initially ordered 29 units, it was later announced that there would be an increase of up to 36 units on order. The first of the Class 800s entered service with GWR in October 2017 and the first of the Class 802s entered service with GWR in August 2018, with all of the units branded as Intercity Express Trains (IET) by GWR.The first unit with London North Eastern Railway (the current holder of the InterCity East Coast franchise) entered service in May 2019 after a delay, with their first trains in service being Class 800s. Their Class 801s entered service afterwards in September 2019. Separately from GWR, these trains are branded as Azuma, which is 'east' in Japanese.

Many other UK operators have bought Hitachi AT300 trains, including orders for Class 802 units by TransPennine Express (branded as Nova 1) and Hull Trains (branded as Paragon). East Midlands Railway have ordered Class 810 units (branded as Aurora), Lumo purchased Class 803 units and Avanti West Coast have ordered Class 805 and Class 807 units.

References

Further reading

External links 

Electric multiple units of Japan
Hitachi rolling stock